The 2013 Southern Football League (SFL) premiership season was an Australian rules football competition staged across Southern Tasmania, Australia, over eighteen roster rounds and six finals series matches between 6 April and 14 September 2013.

The competition's major sponsor for the season was Worksafe Tasmania, Boag's Draught and Telstra. 
This was Kingborough Tigers Football Club's final season in the league. 
The club (known as Kingston from 1885-2003) competed in the SFL as a founding member from 1996 until the completion of this season when they were given approval by AFL Tasmania to join the Tasmanian State League from the start of the 2014 season as a representative of the Kingborough and Huon region in  state league football (rebranded as Tigers FC) to replace the Hobart Football Club who resigned from the TSL late in 2013 to rejoin the SFL from 2014. 
Former Carlton and Brisbane Lions AFL three-time All-Australian and two-time Coleman Medalist full-forward, Brendan Fevola was granted permission by the SFL to play a one-off roster match with New Norfolk in the club's eleventh round home fixture against Brighton on 29 June where he kicked 16 goals in the Eagles 176-point victory.

Participating Clubs
Brighton Football Club
Claremont Football Club
Cygnet Football Club
Dodges Ferry Football Club
East Coast Bombers Football Club
Huonville Lions Football Club
Kingborough Tigers Football Club
Lindisfarne Football Club
New Norfolk District Football Club
Sorell Football Club

2013 SFL Club Coaches
 Jamie Ling (Brighton)
 Kim Excell (Claremont)
 Matt Tyrrell (Cygnet)
 (Dodges Ferry)
 Brett Copping (East Coast)
 Sam Chivers (Huonville Lions)
 Adam Henley (Kingborough Tigers)
 Adrian Goodwin (Lindisfarne)
 Jon Murray (New Norfolk)
 (Sorell)

2013 SFL Leading Goalkickers
 Ben Halton (Cygnet) – 88
 Michael Thompson (New Norfolk) – 75
 Nathan Brown (Claremont) – 59
 Zeke Gardam (New Norfolk) – 58

SFL Reserves Leading Goalkicker
 Kris Cashion (New Norfolk) – 77

SFL Under-18s Leading Goalkicker
 Sam Russell (Sorell) – 71

2013 Medal Winners
 Nathan Ross (New Norfolk) – William Leitch Medal (Seniors) ★ 
 Nathan Burdon (Claremont) – George Watt Medal (Reserves)
 Riley Batchelor (Sorell) – Lipscombe Medal (Under-18s) 
 Jamie Curran (Dodges Ferry) – Hodgman Medal (SFL Intrastate Match)
 Nathan Ross (New Norfolk) – Gorringe-Martyn Medal (Best Player in SFL Grand Final)
Note: Claremont's Nathan Brown polled the highest number of votes in the William Leitch Medal, five votes ahead of Nathan Ross but was ruled ineligible due to being reported and suspended for one match for striking in the final roster round.

SFL Reserves Grand Final
New Norfolk 8.8 (56) d Kingborough 5.8 (38) at KGV Football Park

SFL Under-18's Grand Final
Sorell 9.10 (64) d Kingborough 8.7 (55) at KGV Football Park

2013 SFL Ladder

Round 1
(Saturday, 6 April 2013) 
Cygnet 21.6 (132) d Sorell 15.10 (100) at Cygnet Oval. 
East Coast 19.9 (123) d Brighton 13.7 (85) at Pontville Oval. 
Kingborough 13.8 (86) d Lindisfarne 9.13 (67) at Twin Ovals. 
Claremont 12.24 (96) d New Norfolk 14.10 (94) at Abbotsfield Park. 
Huonville Lions 16.12 (108) d Dodges Ferry 11.7 (73) at Huonville Recreation Ground.

Round 2
(Saturday, 13 April 2013) 
New Norfolk 15.15 (105) d Brighton 7.4 (46) at Pontville Oval. 
East Coast 21.6 (132) d Sorell 10.12 (72) at Pembroke Park. 
Kingborough 13.17 (95) d Claremont 13.12 (90) at Abbotsfield Park. 
Dodges Ferry 18.14 (122) d Cygnet 14.18 (102) at Shark Park. 
Lindisfarne 17.20 (122) d Huonville Lions 9.7 (61) at Anzac Park.

Round 3
(Saturday, 20 April 2013) 
New Norfolk 28.22 (190) d Sorell 9.7 (61) at Boyer Oval.
 
Cygnet 16.16 (112) d Lindisfarne 4.12 (36) at Cygnet Oval. 
Claremont 21.16 (142) d Brighton 10.14 (74) at Pontville Oval. 
Kingborough 21.8 (134) d Huonville Lions 6.8 (44) at Twin Ovals. 
Dodges Ferry 12.10 (82) d East Coast 11.10 (76) at Triabunna Recreation Ground.

Round 4
(Saturday, 27 April 2013) 
Sorell 8.10 (58) d Brighton 6.5 (41) at Pembroke Park. 
East Coast 11.15 (81) d Lindisfarne 9.9 (63) at Anzac Park. 
Kingborough 29.12 (186) d Cygnet 11.9 (75) at Twin Ovals. 
Claremont 8.13 (61) d Huonville Lions 7.12 (54) at Abbotsfield Park. 
New Norfolk 22.20 (152) d Dodges Ferry 8.11 (59) at Shark Park.

Round 5
(Saturday, 4 May 2013) 
Dodges Ferry 13.11 (89) d Brighton 12.11 (83) at Pontville Oval. 
New Norfolk 18.16 (124) d Lindisfarne 13.6 (84) at Boyer Oval. 
Cygnet 14.20 (104) d Huonville Lions 15.8 (98) at Cygnet Oval. 
Claremont 20.17 (137) d Sorell 10.8 (68) at Abbotsfield Park. 
East Coast 16.8 (104) d Kingborough 12.13 (85) at Triabunna Recreation Ground.

Round 6
(Saturday, 11 May 2013) 
Claremont 19.14 (128) d Cygnet 15.12 (102) at Cygnet Oval. 
Lindisfarne 18.19 (127) d Brighton 12.11 (83) at Anzac Park. 
New Norfolk 25.19 (169) d Kingborough 13.6 (84) at Twin Ovals. 
Dodges Ferry 14.23 (107) d Sorell 11.4 (70) at Shark Park. 
Huonville Lions 19.8 (122) d East Coast 13.19 (97) at Huonville Recreation Ground.

Round 7
(Saturday, 25 May 2013) 
Lindisfarne 7.4 (46) d Sorell 1.4 (10) at Pembroke Park. 
Kingborough 14.18 (102) d Brighton 6.7 (43) at Pontville Oval. 
Claremont 16.9 (105) d Dodges Ferry 11.11 (77) at Abbotsfield Park. 
New Norfolk 17.12 (114) d Huonville Lions 11.15 (81) at Boyer Oval. 
East Coast 12.15 (87) d Cygnet 5.6 (36) at Triabunna Recreation Ground.

Round 8
(Saturday, 1 June 2013) 
Kingborough 26.15 (171) d Sorell 3.14 (32) at Twin Ovals. 
Lindisfarne 18.12 (120) d Dodges Ferry 7.7 (49) at Anzac Park. 
New Norfolk 16.19 (115) d Cygnet 11.13 (79) at Cygnet Oval. 
Huonville Lions 20.16 (136) d Brighton 13.7 (85) at Huonville Recreation Ground. 
Claremont 19.13 (127) d East Coast 9.10 (64) at Triabunna Recreation Ground.

Round 9
(Saturday, 15 June 2013) 
Cygnet 14.9 (93) d Brighton 7.7 (49) at Pontville Oval. 
New Norfolk 19.25 (139) d East Coast 4.7 (31) at Boyer Oval. 
Claremont 11.9 (75) d Lindisfarne 3.7 (25) at Abbotsfield Park. 
Kingborough 12.13 (85) d Dodges Ferry 12.9 (81) at Shark Park. 
Huonville Lions 10.16 (76) d Sorell 6.14 (50) at Pembroke Park.

Round 10
(Saturday, 22 June 2013) 
Kingborough 12.13 (85) d Lindisfarne 7.17 (59) at Anzac Park. 
Cygnet 15.12 (102) d Sorell 13.14 (92) at Pembroke Park. 
New Norfolk 20.18 (138) d Claremont 7.4 (46) at Boyer Oval. 
Huonville Lions 17.17 (119) d Dodges Ferry 11.7 (73) at Shark Park. 
East Coast 10.12 (72) d Brighton 9.9 (63) at Triabunna Recreation Ground.

Round 11
(Saturday, 29 June 2013) 
New Norfolk 29.17 (191) d Brighton 2.3 (15) at Boyer Oval.* 
Cygnet 17.10 (112) d Dodges Ferry 12.12 (84) at Cygnet Oval. 
Kingborough 14.13 (97) d Claremont 11.10 (76) at Twin Ovals. 
East Coast 18.15 (123) d Sorell 6.8 (44) at Triabunna Recreation Ground. 
Huonville Lions 13.11 (89) d Lindisfarne 9.15 (69) at Huonville Recreation Ground. 
Note: Brendan Fevola makes guest appearance for New Norfolk and kicks 16 goals.

Round 12
(Saturday, 6 July 2013) 
Lindisfarne 14.10 (94) d Cygnet 5.6 (36) at Anzac Park. 
New Norfolk 20.14 (134) d Sorell 8.9 (57) at Boyer Oval. 
Claremont 15.19 (109) d Brighton 4.12 (36) at Abbotsfield Park. 
East Coast 15.10 (100) d Dodges Ferry 6.12 (48) at Shark Park. 
Kingborough 16.14 (110) d Huonville Lions 9.5 (59) at Twin Ovals.

Round 13
(Saturday, 13 July 2013) 
Brighton 18.17 (125) d Sorell 4.10 (34) at Pontville Oval. 
Cygnet 15.7 (97) d Kingborough 13.14 (92) at Cygnet Oval. 
New Norfolk 14.16 (100) d Dodges Ferry 10.7 (67) at Boyer Oval. 
Lindisfarne 17.8 (110) d East Coast 14.4 (88) at Triabunna Recreation Ground. 
Claremont 15.13 (103) d Huonville Lions 12.16 (88) at Huonville Recreation Ground.

Round 14
(Saturday, 20 July 2013) 
New Norfolk 22.21 (153) d Lindisfarne 8.13 (61) at Anzac Park. 
Kingborough 24.13 (157) d East Coast 4.7 (31) at Twin Ovals. 
Claremont 26.21 (177) d Sorell 6.6 (42) at Pembroke Park. 
Dodges Ferry 17.18 (120) d Brighton 14.14 (98) at Shark Park. 
Huonville Lions 17.10 (112) d Cygnet 15.12 (102) at Huonville Recreation Ground.

Round 15
(Saturday, 27 July 2013) 
New Norfolk 22.20 (152) d Kingborough 7.7 (49) at Boyer Oval. 
Sorell 16.8 (104) d Dodges Ferry 16.7 (103) at Pembroke Park. 
Lindisfarne 16.13 (109) d Brighton 8.15 (63) at Pontville Oval. 
Claremont 25.14 (164) d Cygnet 13.12 (90) at Abbotsfield Park. 
East Coast 16.8 (104) d Huonville Lions 11.13 (79) at Triabunna Recreation Ground.

Round 16
(Saturday, 3 August 2013) 
Kingborough 11.12 (78) d Brighton 9.8 (62) at Twin Ovals. 
Lindisfarne 24.17 (161) d Sorell 7.7 (49) at Anzac Park. 
Cygnet 18.7 (115) d East Coast 10.17 (77) at Cygnet Oval. 
Claremont 19.15 (129) d Dodges Ferry 6.11 (47) at Shark Park. 
New Norfolk 13.15 (93) d Huonville Lions 7.8 (50) at Huonville Recreation Ground.

Round 17
(Saturday, 10 August 2013) 
Claremont 9.10 (64) d East Coast 4.8 (32) at Abbotsfield Park. 
New Norfolk 32.16 (208) d Cygnet 6.8 (44) at Boyer Oval. 
Kingborough 17.9 (111) d Sorell 4.5 (29) at Pembroke Park. 
Lindisfarne 14.10 (94) d Dodges Ferry 8.10 (58) at Shark Park. 
Huonville Lions 11.15 (81) d Brighton 6.8 (44) at Pontville Oval.

Round 18
(Saturday, 17 August 2013) 
Claremont 18.12 (120) d Lindisfarne 12.8 (80) at Anzac Park. 
Cygnet 21.14 (140) d Brighton 9.7 (61) at Cygnet Oval. 
Kingborough 16.14 (110) d Dodges Ferry 9.13 (67) at Twin Ovals. 
New Norfolk 18.17 (125) d East Coast 11.11 (77) at Triabunna Recreation Ground. 
Huonville Lions 15.28 (118) d Sorell 8.6 (54) at Huonville Recreation Ground.

Elimination Final
(Saturday, 24 August 2013) 
Lindisfarne: 1.4 (10) | 9.8 (62) | 14.10 (94) | 17.16 (118) 
Huonville Lions: 3.2 (20) | 4.3.(27) | 5.5 (35) | 7.8 (50) 
Attendance: N/A at Anzac Park.

Qualifying Final
(Saturday, 24 August 2013) 
Claremont: 2.1 (13) | 3.8 (26) | 10.10 (70) | 12.13 (85) 
Kingborough: 2.3 (15) | 3.4 (22) | 8.4 (52) | 9.5 (59) 
Attendance: N/A at Abbotsfield Park.

First Semi Final
(Saturday 31 August 2013) 
Kingborough: 2.5 (17) | 4.6 (30) | 8.13 (61) | 11.14 (80) 
Lindisfarne: 1.2 (8) | 4.3 (27) | 6.5 (41) | 8.8 (56) 
Attendance: N/A at Twin Ovals, Kingston.

Second Semi Final
(Saturday, 31 August 2013) 
New Norfolk: 4.4 (28) | 11.7 (73) | 14.8 (92) | 17.14 (116) 
Claremont: 3.2 (20) | 4.5 (29) | 9.6 (60) | 13.8 (86) 
Attendance: N/A at Boyer Oval.

Preliminary Final
(Saturday, 7 September 2013) 
Claremont: 4.1 (25) | 5.3 (33) | 6.6 (42) | 10.7 (67) 
Kingborough: 3.4 (22) | 3.6 (24) | 6.9 (45) | 7.11 (53) 
Attendance: N/A at KGV Football Park.

Grand Final
(Saturday, 14 September 2013) 
New Norfolk: 4.4 (28) | 6.12 (48) | 11.12 (78) | 15.15 (105) 
Claremont: 2.5 (17) | 3.5 (23) | 8.7 (55) | 9.8 (62) 
Attendance: 5,337 at KGV Football Park.

External links 
 Official League Website (2013)

2013
2013 in Australian rules football